WHSA (89.9 FM) is an American radio station licensed to Brule, Wisconsin, and serving the Duluth/Superior area. The station is part of Wisconsin Public Radio (WPR), and airs WPR's "NPR News and Classical Network", consisting of classical music and news and talk programming. WHSA also broadcasts regional news and programming from studios in the Holden Fine Arts Center at the University of Wisconsin-Superior.

See also Wisconsin Public Radio

Translators
WHSA was relayed by an additional translator station W284AN. This has now been removed from the FCC FM Query.

External links
Wisconsin Public Radio

HSA
University of Wisconsin–Superior
Wisconsin Public Radio
Classical music radio stations in the United States
NPR member stations